Criminalization of poverty is the phenomenon in which poor people face higher consequences for the same actions as a wealthier person, due to their lack of financial resources. Examples include fines and fees that the person is unable to pay, anti-homelessness laws and actions, and interconnections between welfare and criminal law.

References

Further reading

Criminal law
Poverty